Dinić is a Serbian surname. It may refer to:

Vladan Dinić (born 1949), Serbian journalist, TV-host and editor-in-chief
Suzana Dinić (born 1986), Serbian singer and pianist
Ivan Dinić (born 1971), Serbian artist, designer
Mihailo Dinić (1899—1970), Serbian historian and member of the Serbian Academy of Science and Arts

Serbian surnames